Jelena Lavko (née Živković; born 6 July 1991) is a Serbian handball player for Minaur Baia Mare and the Serbian national team.

She was also capped several times for the Serbian national team and participated at the 2010 European Championship and 2013 World Championship.

Achievements
2013 World Championship:
Runner-up: 2013
Serbian Championship:
Winner: 2011
Serbian Cup:
Winner: 2011
Nemzeti Bajnokság I:
Runner-up: 2012
EHF Cup Winners' Cup:
Winner: 2012

Individual awards 
Carpathian Trophy Top Scorer: 2018

References

External links

 

1991 births
Living people
Sportspeople from Zrenjanin
Serbian female handball players
Expatriate handball players
Serbian expatriate sportspeople in Croatia
Serbian expatriate sportspeople in Hungary
Serbian expatriate sportspeople in Montenegro
Serbian expatriate sportspeople in Romania
Mediterranean Games gold medalists for Serbia
Competitors at the 2013 Mediterranean Games
Fehérvár KC players
CS Minaur Baia Mare (women's handball) players
Ferencvárosi TC players (women's handball)
Mediterranean Games medalists in handball
RK Podravka Koprivnica players
Competitors at the 2009 Mediterranean Games